The Quarterback is a 1926 American comedy silent film directed by Fred C. Newmeyer and written by William Slavens McNutt, W. O. McGeehan and Ray Harris. The film stars Richard Dix, Esther Ralston, Harry Beresford, David Butler, Robert W. Craig and Mona Palma. The film was released on October 11, 1926, by Paramount Pictures.

Plot
Elmer Stone, quarterback of the 1899 Colton College football team vows to remain a student until Colton beats its biggest rival, State University. Twenty-seven years later, Elmer is still in school and is a classmate of his son, Jack. Other than driving a milk wagon in his spare time, Jack is also the quarterback of the football team. A matter of his eligibility comes up but he is cleared and goes out to do-or-die for Colton against State University. Maybe they will win The Big Game, and Jack's father can get a life...and a job.

Cast 
Richard Dix as Jack Stone
Esther Ralston as Louise Mason
Harry Beresford as Elmer Stone
David Butler as 'Lumpy' Goggins
Robert W. Craig as Denny Walters
Mona Palma as Nellie Webster

Preservation status
The film is preserved in the Library of Congress collection.

References

External links 
 

1926 films
American black-and-white films
American football films
American silent feature films
American sports comedy films
Films directed by Fred C. Newmeyer
Paramount Pictures films
1920s sports comedy films
1926 comedy films
1920s English-language films
1920s American films
Silent American comedy films
Silent sports comedy films